United Nations Security Council resolution 462, adopted on 9 January 1980, after considering an item on the agenda of the council and given the lack of unanimity amongst its permanent members, the council decided to call an emergency meeting of the United Nations General Assembly to discuss the Soviet invasion of Afghanistan.

Two days prior to the adoption of Resolution 462, a previous draft resolution had been vetoed by the Soviet Union. During the discussions of the draft resolution, some members of the council highlighted the serious nature of the situation and that it justified a general assembly debate.

The resolution was adopted by 12 votes to two against (East Germany, Soviet Union) with one abstention from Zambia.

Following the resolution, the Sixth emergency special session of the United Nations General Assembly took place.

See also
 List of United Nations Security Council Resolutions 401 to 500 (1976–1982)
 'Uniting for Peace' Resolution

References

External links
 
Text of the Resolution at undocs.org

 0462
Political history of Afghanistan
Afghanistan–Soviet Union relations
1980 in the Soviet Union
 0462
 0462
January 1980 events